"Det var en gång en fågel" is the debut single by Swedish band Laser Inc, which was released in 2007 by Warner Music Sweden. The song has peaked at number 6 on the Swedish singles chart.

Track listing

Music video
Music video was uploaded on 11 January 2011 by Extensive Music on YouTube.

Charts

Weekly charts

Year-end charts

Release history

References 

2007 singles
2007 songs
Warner Music Group singles